Keramati is a surname of Iranian origin. Notable people with the surname include:

 Mahtab Keramati (born 1970), Iranian actress
 Simin Keramati (born 1970), Iranian-born Canadian multidisciplinary artist

Surnames of Iranian origin